Arklow Rowing Club is a coastal rowing club located in Arklow, County Wicklow, Ireland. Founded in 1990, the club is a member of the East Coast Rowing Council and affiliated to Rowing Ireland, and races year-round in local, national, and international events.

Racing 
Each year the ECRC organises a summer schedule of regattas at clubs from Ringsend to Arklow where crews of all ages compete during the regatta. ECRC clubs also regularly compete in the biennial ‘Celtic Challenge’, a race of over 90 miles from Arklow to Aberystwyth in Wales as well as other long distance races such as the annual Ocean to City race in Cork, or the Kish lighthouse row in Dublin. Clubs can be regularly seen training at sea along the East Coast between April and September each year.

Achievements 
Arklow has won various Irish titles across many Coastal Rowing categories, and has qualified crews for multiple World Championships.

References 

Rowing in Ireland
Rowing clubs